Lord Street may refer to:
Lord Street, Liverpool, one of the streets in Liverpool, England, that forms the city's main shopping district
Lord Street, Southport, the main shopping street of Southport, in Merseyside, England
Lord Street, Perth, a street in Perth, Western Australia
Drumpellier Drive, a road in Perth, Western Australia formerly known as Lord Street